Edward John Lewis (5 December 1859 – 8 June 1925) was a Welsh medical doctor and international rugby union half-back who played club rugby for Llandovery College and international rugby for Wales. He won just a single game for Wales when he was selected for the first Welsh rugby international.

Personal life
Lewis was born in 1859 in Llandovery to John Lewis, and was educated first at Llandovery College and then graduated to Christ's College, Cambridge in 1878. He gained his BA in 1882 and his Bachelor of Medicine in 1887 from St Bartholomew's Hospital. Lewis continued with his studies throughout his career, and was awarded his LSA in 1884, MRCS in 1884 and his FRCS in 1890. He completed his senior house officer period at St Batholomew's, before becoming a consulting physician at Kilburn Dispensary. He began his speciality in pediatrics when he took up a position as surgeon at Clergy Orphan School in Marylebone, later taking a post as Senior Resident Medical Officer at Great Ormond Street Hospital. His final post was as Resident Medical Officer at the Royal Free Hospital in London.

Rugby career 

When Newport Athletic secretary, Richard Mullock, was successful in gaining an agreed fixture from the Rugby Football Union between the English team and a yet to be formed Wales side; he had a short period to recruit a Welsh team. Mullock had future plans to form a Welsh Rugby Union, so selected a team of 'gentlemen players' that represented a wide spread of clubs from around Wales. Lewis was not only an ex-Cambridge student, having graduated from Christ's College but also represented Llandovery, and was called up to represent the first Welsh team. Lewis was placed at the key position of half-back, paired with Llandaff's Leonard Watkins. The game was a disaster for the Welsh team. The team was badly organised, having never played together before, and several players out of position. In the first ten minutes of the start of the game, both Lewis and Wales forward B. B. Mann were injured, both eventually leaving the field of play before the final whistle. Wales were totally out-classed, losing by eight goals to nil, and Lewis never represented his country again.

International matches played
Wales
  1881

Bibliography

References 

1859 births
1925 deaths
19th-century Welsh medical doctors
Alumni of Christ's College, Cambridge
Alumni of the Medical College of St Bartholomew's Hospital
British surgeons
Fellows of the Royal College of Surgeons
People educated at Llandovery College
Rugby union players from Llandovery
Wales international rugby union players
Welsh rugby union players